Koilwar (also spelt Koelwar) is a nagar panchayat town and corresponding community development block in Bhojpur district in the Indian state of Bihar. As of 2011, the population of Koilwar town was 17,725, in 2,893 households. It lies on the Arrah-Patna railway route. It is one of the 14 blocks under Bhojpur district.

Geography

It is situated on the bank of Son River.

Koilwar Bridge

Koilwar Bridge is situated on the River Sone; its steel rail road bridge called as Abdul Bari Bridge made before independence, is shown in the film Gandhi. The Koelwar bridge across the Sone river was built by the British in 1862. A two lane road (NH 30) runs just under the rail tracks. Sand mining near the pillars of this old bridge has created structural problems recently.

A famous Shiv Temple is the moonlight of the village. On every 14 January and on the eve of Mahashivratri a fair takes place near the temple.

New Koilwar Bridge

Demographics

In the 2001 India census, Koilwar had a population of 19,925. Males constitute 61% of the population and females 39%. Koilwar has an average literacy rate of 55%, lower than the national average of 59.5%. Male literacy is 55%, female literacy 54%. 19% of the population is under 6 years of age.

Economy
The main commodities produced in Koilwar are paneer and tilkut.

Transport
The Koilwar town is very well connected by roads, highways and Rail routes to various cities like Patna, Danapur, Bihta, Arrah, Buxar in Bihar; and Mughalsarai and Varanasi in Uttar Pradesh.

Roads
 Patna-Arrah-Buxar (NH-922)
 Arrah-Chhapra Bridge
 Sakaddi-Nasriganj (SH-81)

Railway
 Koilwar railway station: KWR (0 km)
 Arrah Junction (14 km)
 Bihta railway station (8 km)
 Patna Junction railway station (35 km)

Airway
 Patna Airport (36 km)
 Bihta Airport (14 km)

List of villages
The list of 68 villages in Koilwar Block (under Arrah Tehsil) is as follows: (GP is Gram Panchayat).

References

Cities and towns in Bhojpur district, India
Populated places on the Son River